The Day Will Come is a 2016 Danish drama film directed by Jesper W. Nielsen. It won six prizes at the 2017 Robert Awards.

Cast
Lars Mikkelsen as Forstander Frederik Heck
Sofie Gråbøl as Lærer Lilian
Harald Kaiser Hermann as Elmer
 as Erik
Laurids Skovgaard Andersen as Tøger
Lars Ranthe as Overlærer Toft Lassen
Søren Sætter-Lassen as Lærer Aksel
David Dencik as Inspektør Hartmann
Sonja Richter as Moren
Solbjørg Højfeldt as Fru Oskarson
 as Røde
Oskar Damsgaard as Topper

References

External links

2016 drama films
Best Danish Film Robert Award winners
Danish drama films
Films directed by Jesper W. Nielsen

Zentropa films